Dennis Robert Lenz is an American politician serving as a member of the Montana House of Representatives from the 53rd district. Elected in November 2016, he assumed office in January 2017. Lenz had previously served in the House from 2013 to 2015.

Education 
Lenz earned a certificate in pastoral ministry from the Yellowstone Valley Bible Institute and another in ranch management from Texas Christian University.

Career 
Since 1984, Lenz has worked as a self-employed farmer. From 1984 to 2016, he was a captain in the Billings Fire Department. Lenz was a candidate for the Montana House of Representatives in 2010, losing to incumbent Democrat Margaret MacDonald. He ran again in 2013, defeating Democratic nominee Deborah Willis. He served for one term and was defeated by Democrat Jessica Karjala in 2014. Lenz was re-elected to his old seat in 2016, defeating Jordan Matney.

Personal life 
Lenz and his wife, Deanna, have two children.

References 

Republican Party members of the Montana House of Representatives
Politicians from Billings, Montana
Living people
Year of birth missing (living people)